Sabotage is the sixth studio album by English heavy metal band Black Sabbath, released in July 1975. The album was recorded in the midst of a legal battle with the band's former manager Patrick Meehan. The stress that resulted from the band's ongoing legal woes infiltrated the recording process, inspiring the album's title. It was co-produced by guitarist Tony Iommi and Mike Butcher.

Recording 
Black Sabbath began work on their sixth album in February 1975, again in England at Morgan Studios in Willesden, London. The title Sabotage was chosen because the band were at the time being sued by their former management and felt they were being "sabotaged all the way along the line and getting punched from all sides", according to Iommi. "It was probably the only album ever made with lawyers in the studio," said drummer Bill Ward. Iommi credits those legal troubles for the album's angry, heavier sound.

In 2001, bassist Geezer Butler explained to Dan Epstein, "Around the time of Sabbath Bloody Sabbath, we found out that we were being ripped off by our management and our record company. So, much of the time, when we weren't onstage or in the studio, we were in lawyer's offices trying to get out of all our contracts. We were literally in the studio, trying to record, and we'd be signing all these affidavits and everything. That's why it's called Sabotage – because we felt that the whole process was just being totally sabotaged by all these people ripping us off."  In his autobiography I Am Ozzy, singer Ozzy Osbourne confirms that "writs were being delivered to us at the mixing desk" and that Ward "was manning the phones". In the liner notes to the 1998 live album Reunion, Butler claimed the band suffered through 10 months of legal cases and admitted, "Music became irrelevant to me. It was a relief just to write a song."

Iommi later reflected, "We could've continued and gone on and on, getting more technical, using orchestras and everything else which we didn't particularly want to. We took a look at ourselves, and we wanted to do a rock album – Sabbath Bloody Sabbath wasn't a rock album, really." According to the book How Black Was Our Sabbath, "The recording sessions would usually carry on into the middle of the night. Tony Iommi was working really hard on the production side of things with the band's co-producer Mike Butcher, and he was spending a lot of time working out his guitar sounds. Bill, too, was experimenting with the drums, especially favouring the 'backwards cymbal' effect."  Osbourne, however, grew frustrated with how long Black Sabbath albums were taking to record, writing in his autobiography, "Sabotage took about four thousand years."

According to Iommi, the Sabotage sessions were the scene of a legendary jam session between Black Sabbath and Led Zeppelin. Iommi's recollection may be inaccurate, however, as records show that Zeppelin were on tour in the US at the time Sabotage was being recorded. Ward's recollection of the exact timing of the Zeppelin jam session is also fuzzy. "I don't even know what album we were working on", the drummer explained. "But one of John (Bonham)'s favourite songs was 'Supernaut' – so, when they came down to the studio, he wanted to jam 'Supernaut'." It is more likely that the jam session took place during the recording of the previous album, Sabbath Bloody Sabbath.

Composition
Sabotage is a mix of heavy, powerful songs and softer experimental tunes, such as "Supertzar" and "Am I Going Insane (Radio)". In 2013 Mojo observed, "Opener 'Hole in the Sky' and the crunching 'Symptom of the Universe' illustrate that, for all their problems, Sabbath's power remained undimmed on what was what many consider one of their finest offerings."  In the article "Thrash Metal - An Introduction" in University Times Magazine, Vladimir Rakhmanin cites "Symptom of the Universe" as one of the earliest examples of thrash metal, a heavy metal subgenre which emerged in the early 1980s. Tony Iommi describes the song's dynamics in his autobiography Iron Man: "It starts with an acoustic bit. Then it goes into the up-tempo stuff to give it that dynamic, and it does have a lot of changes to it, including the jam at the end."  The final part of "Symptom of the Universe" evolved from an in-studio improvisation, created very spontaneously in a single day and the decision was made to use it in that song. The English Chamber Choir was brought in to perform on the song "Supertzar". When vocalist Ozzy Osbourne arrived at the studio and saw them, he thought he was in the wrong studio and left. The title of the pop-leaning "Am I Going Insane (Radio)" caused some confusion due to the "(Radio)" part, which led people to believe the song was a radio cut or radio version. However, this is the only version of the song: the term "radio-rental" is rhyming slang for "mental".

"The Writ" is one of only a handful of Black Sabbath songs to feature lyrics composed by vocalist Osbourne, who typically relied on bassist Butler for lyrics. The song was inspired by the frustrations Osbourne felt at the time, as Black Sabbath's former manager Patrick Meehan was suing the band after having been fired. The song viciously attacks the music business in general and is a savage diatribe directed towards Meehan specifically ("Are you Satan? Are you man?"), with Osbourne revealing in his memoir, "I wrote most of the lyrics myself, which felt a bit like seeing a shrink. All the anger I felt towards Meehan came pouring out."  During this period, the band began to question if there was any point to recording albums and touring endlessly "just to pay the lawyers". Thematically, "The Writ" and "Megalomania" are intertwined, according to drummer Ward, as they both deal with the same tensions arising from these ongoing legal troubles.

The brief instrumental "Don't Start (Too Late)" is an acoustic guitar showpiece for Iommi, titled for tape operator David Harris who often despaired at Sabbath being prone to start playing before he was ready.

Artwork
Sabotages front cover art has garnered mixed reactions over the years and is regarded by some as one of the worst album covers in rock history. The inverted mirror concept was conceived by Graham Wright, Bill Ward's drum tech, who was also a graphic artist. The band attended what they believed was a test photo shoot for the album cover, thus explaining their choice of clothing. Said Ward, "The only thing we didn't discuss was what we'd all wear on the day of the shot. Since that shoot day, the band has survived through a tirade of clothing comments and jokes that continue to this day". Ward, in fact, was wearing his wife's red tights in the photo. Wright recalls in the book How Black Was Our Sabbath that the plan was for each band member to appear on the cover dressed in black and had been instructed to bring some stage clothes for preliminary photos, but when they arrived no black costumes had been laid out by the designers and "the original concept had been overruled."  The designers "carried on with the shoot, explaining they would superimpose the images at a later stage and that it would look great, honest. The session was unbelievably rushed, and the outcome was far from what had been originally envisaged ... Ironically, the sleeve design that was intended to illustrate the idea of sabotage had instead become a victim of sabotage itself. By the time they saw it, it was too late to change."

Release and reception

Sabotage was released on 28 July 1975 and peaked at number 7 in the United Kingdom and at number 28 in the United States. It was certified Silver (60,000 units sold) in the UK by the BPI on 1 December 1975 and Gold in the US on 16 June 1997, but was the band's first release not to achieve platinum status in the US. For the second time, a Black Sabbath album initially saw favourable reviews, with Rolling Stone stating "Sabotage is not only Black Sabbath's best record since Paranoid, it might be their best ever." Later reviews were also favourable; Greg Prato of AllMusic said that "Sabotage is the final release of Black Sabbath's legendary First Six" but noted that "the magical chemistry that made such albums as Paranoid and Vol. 4 so special was beginning to disintegrate." Guitarist Yngwie Malmsteen told Nick Bowcott of Guitar Player in 2008 that the riff to "Symptom of the Universe" was the first Tony Iommi riff he ever heard and that "Tony's use of the flat fifth would have got him burned at the stake a couple hundred years ago." In 2017, Rolling Stone ranked it 32nd on their "100 Greatest Metal Albums of All Time" list.

The band toured the US in support of Sabotage in 1975, which included a filmed appearance for the prestigious series Don Kirshner's Rock Concert at the Santa Monica Civic Auditorium. Sabbath played "Killing Yourself to Live", "Hole in the Sky", "Snowblind", "War Pigs" and "Paranoid". During Iommi's guitar solo during "Snowblind", plastic snowflakes were dropped from above on the audience and the band, a gimmick used during the band's live shows during this period. According to the book How Black Was Our Sabbath, "The audience was limited to just a couple thousand fans, and it seemed like the whole of LA got wind of it."  Due to the band's expanding use of orchestras and other new sounds in the studio, the tour in support of Sabotage was the first in which Black Sabbath used a full-time keyboardist onstage, Gerald "Jezz" Woodroffe. Black Sabbath toured with openers Kiss, but were forced to cut the tour short in November 1975, after vocalist Osbourne was injured in a motorcycle accident.

Track listing
All tracks written by Black Sabbath (Geezer Butler, Tony Iommi, Ozzy Osbourne and Bill Ward).

Notes
 Some versions of Sabotage contain a short hidden track entitled "Blow on a Jug" at the end of "The Writ", recorded at a very low volume.
 Discs two and three of the 2021 Super Deluxe edition feature a live recording of the band's performance on 5 August 1975 at the Convention Hall in Asbury Park, New Jersey. Tracks 2, 4 and 6 of disc two were previously released on the 2002 live album Past Lives, while tracks 1, 3, 5, 7-11 of disc two and tracks 1-5 of disc three were all previously unreleased. Despite that, this entire recording has been available on bootleg releases for many years.
 Disc four of the 2021 Super Deluxe edition features a single edit for “Am I Going Insane (Radio)”, followed by “Hole In The Sky” (being the B-side on the vinyl version), with artwork replicating the very rare Japanese release of the single.

Personnel

Black Sabbath 
 Ozzy Osbourne – lead vocals 
 Tony Iommi – guitars, piano, synthesizer, organ, harp 
 Geezer Butler – bass 
 Bill Ward – drums, percussion, piano and backing/scat vocals on "Blow on a Jug"

Additional personnel 
 Will Malone – arrangements for the English Chamber Choir
 Black Sabbath – co-producer
 Mike Butcher – co-producer / engineer
 Robin Black – engineer
 David Harris – tape operator and saboteur

Charts

Certifications

References

Sources

External links
 

1975 albums
Albums recorded at Morgan Sound Studios
Black Sabbath albums
Vertigo Records albums
Warner Records albums